Gabriela Roel (born 13 December 1959) is a Mexican film and television actress.

Filmography

Film

Television

References

External links 
 

1959 births
Living people
People from Delicias, Chihuahua
Mexican film actresses
Mexican television actresses
Actresses from Chihuahua (state)